The 1964 All-Ireland Intermediate Hurling Championship was the fourth staging of the All-Ireland hurling championship. The championship ended on 20 September 1964.

Tipperary were the defending champions, however, they were defeated in the provincial championship. Wexford won the title after defeating London by 4–7 to 1–11 in the final.

References

Intermediate
All-Ireland Intermediate Hurling Championship